Jacqueline, comtesse de Ribes (born 14 July 1929) is a French aristocrat, designer, fashion icon, businesswoman, producer and philanthropist. She has been a member of the International Best Dressed List since 1962.

Early life
Jacqueline Bonnin de La Bonninière de Beaumont was born on 14 July 1929 in Paris to Jean de Beaumont, comte Bonnin de la Bonninière de Beaumont (1904–2002) and Paule de Rivaud de La Raffinière (1908–1999). On 30 January 1948, Jacqueline married Vicomte Édouard de Ribes, a successful banker who subsequently became comte de Ribes and Officer of the Legion of Honour, Croix de guerre 1939-1945. They had two children, Elizabeth and Jean.

In 1939, when she was 10, de Ribes's parents sent her and her siblings to Hendaye with a nanny during World War II. They lived in the concierge's cottage, as the main house was requisitioned by the Gestapo. Worried that the American army would land on the beaches of Hendaye and endanger their children, de Ribes's parents moved them again to the château of the Count and Countess Solages in central France. They shared the château with occupying German soldiers, and were liberated by American soldiers in 1942. After the war, Jacqueline returned to school at the convent of Les Oiseaux in Verneuil.

Life in fashion and society
In the 1950s and 1960s, before she began designing her own collections, de Ribes employed couture dressmakers to create custom garments for her. In the '70s she began modifying these gowns to create elaborate costumes for fancy-dress balls. In 1955 she employed Oleg Cassini to make her custom gowns based on muslin patterns de Ribes cut on the floor of her attic. She employed a young and then unknown Valentino to create the sketches that accompanied them.

For twelve years de Ribes created ready-to-wear collections, using marketing techniques to attract famous and elegant international clients such as Joan Collins, Raquel Welch, Barbara Walters, Baroness von Thyssen, Cher, Danielle Steel, Olympia de Rothschild, and Marie-Hélène de Rothschild.

Her first fashion show was held in the home of Yves Saint Laurent. Her creations have been positively received with fashion journalists Hebe Dorsey of the International Herald Tribune and John Fairchild of Women's Wear Daily singing her praises. De Ribes's collection performed well commercially, and she signed an exclusive three-year contract with Saks Fifth Avenue after her first collection debuted. By 1985, her line was grossing $3 million annually.

In 1986, Japanese cosmetics conglomerate Kanebo acquired a minority stake in the company. De Ribes was unhappy with requests to change the proportions and designs of her collections for Japanese markets.

After being hospitalized for debilitating back pain, de Ribes underwent hemilaminectomy surgery in 1994 which left her unable to walk for three years. During this time she also began to suffer from celiac disease, and due to these health problems was forced to dissolve her company in 1995.

On 14 July 2010, the French President Nicolas Sarkozy decorated her as a Chevalier of the Légion d'honneur at the Elysée Palace.

From 19 November 2015 to 21 February 2016, the Costume Institute at the Metropolitan Museum in New York City featured "The Art of Style", an exhibition featuring items from de Ribes's wardrobe. The thematic show showed about sixty ensembles of haute couture and ready-to-wear primarily from her personal archive, dating from 1959 to the present. Also included were her creations for fancy-dress balls, as well as numerous photographs and ephemera, recounting the story of how her interest in fashion developed over decades, from childhood "dress-up" to the epitome of international style.

Theatre artistic director and producer of Cuevas Ballet
In 1958, she produced the first play performed at the new Recamier Theatre, When five years will be passed by Federico García Lorca, with Laurent Terzieff and Pascale de Boysson and a Raimundo de Larrain scenery.

After the Marquis de Cuevas died in 1961, de Ribes became the new manager of the International Ballet of the Marquis de Cuevas. With sidekick de Larrain as impresario. Together with Raymundo de Larrian, they produced a version of Prokofiev’s Cinderella with Geraldine Chaplin, daughter of Charlie Chaplin. De Ribes worked 15-hour days during her time managing the ballet, eventually dissolving it three years later due to a lack of resources.

Producer, movies, television
Following this experience, she co-produced the initiative for the first French television channel, a film in three episodes from the book by Luigi Barzini "Italians", published by Gallimard in 1966.  It was during this trip that Visconti asked her to play the duchesse de Guermantes in his next film In Search ... based on the novel by Marcel Proust, she agreed. The film was cancelled after Visconti fell sick. In the 1970s, she focused her efforts on volunteering for show production and co-produced Eurovision television shows to benefit UNICEF.

Active "mécène" of many museums and institutions
De Ribes chaired the Association of Friends of Foreign Orsay Museum during the Monet exhibition in Tokyo in 1996. She supports several museums and foundations in France. She accepted, at the 2007 Biennale, the chairmanship of Venetian Heritage.

Humanitarian and charitable activities
Jacqueline de Ribes has supported humanitarian causes throughout the world. De Ribes won the prestigious Women of Achievement Award  in 1980, alongside Bette Davis, Iris Love, Ann Getty, Dame Sheila Sherlock and Jessie M. Rattley, among others.

Ecology
De Ribes is a pioneer in the field of nature conservation and ecology. As early as 1974 in the Balearic Islands, she advocated for the respect of the natural beauty and for the survival of the species in the area. She also orchestrated an international campaign to safeguard the Mediterranean island of Espalmaor, a migratory bird refuge, successfully fighting for the classification of the island as a nature reserve.

Recognition
 Appeared the first time on the International Best Dressed List in 1956.
 She was named to the International Best Dressed List Hall of Fame in 1962.
 In 1983, she was voted the "Most Stylish Woman in the World" by Town and Country.
 As a designer, she received the Rodeo Drive Award in 1985.
 In 1999, French designer Jean-Paul Gaultier dedicated his collection to Jacqueline de Ribes.

Family
The Countess de Ribes, was born Jacqueline de Beaumont, she is the daughter of Count Jean de Beaumont (1904-2002) Commander of the Legion of Honor, vice president of the International Olympic Committee, president of the French Academy of Sports and chairman of Cercle de l'Union interalliée, and his wife, the Countess (née Paule Rivaud de La Raffinière; 1908-1999), a woman of letters.

See also
 1960s in fashion
 Diana Vreeland
 Oscar de la Renta
 Diane von Furstenberg

References
Notes

Bibliography

External links
 
 Profile, fashionencyclopedia.com; accessed 30 August 2015.
 Profile, vanityfair.com; accessed 30 August 2015.
 Pinterest Ribes's Fans Pinterest
 Profile, HuffingtonPost.com; accessed 30 August 2015.
 Profile, telegraph.co.uk; accessed 30 August 2015.
 Profile, theredlist.com; accessed 30 August 2015.

French socialites
French fashion designers
French women fashion designers
1929 births
Chevaliers of the Légion d'honneur
Living people